Jun'an is a town in Shunde District, Foshan prefecture-level city, Guangdong Province, southern China.

Martial artist Bruce Lee's father Lee Hoi-chuen was born in Jun'an, his ancestral roots can be found in Jun'an. There is a street in the village named after Bruce Lee where his ancestral home is situated. The home is open for public access. There is also a theme park built after Bruce Lee.

External links
 Bruce Lee's Legacy Honored with Theme Park in Jun'an Town

Shunde District
Towns in Guangdong